Dominick Browne, Mayor of Galway, 1688–1689.

Browne was a grandson of Sir Dominick Browne and a member of The Tribes of Galway. He was one of the first Catholics to become Mayor since 1654, and would be one of the last of the mayors who was a member of the tribal families.

His descendants would include Baron Oranmore and Browne, Garech Browne and Tara Browne.

References
"History of Galway", James Hardiman, 1820
"Old Galway", Maureen Donovan O'Sullivan, 1942
The Tribes of Galway", Adrian J. Martyn, 2001
 Henry, William (2002). Role of Honour: The Mayors of Galway City 1485-2001. Galway: Galway City Council.  
Kidd, Charles, Williamson, David (editors). Debrett's Peerage and Baronetage (1990 edition). New York: St Martin's Press, 1990.

Politicians from County Galway
Mayors of Galway
17th-century Irish businesspeople